Disney Art Academy is an educational art training video game developed by Headstrong Games, published by Nintendo and released for the Nintendo 3DS handheld game console. It is a spin-off of the Art Academy series centered on Disney and Pixar characters. The first game was announced on Nintendo Direct for March 3, 2016 and was then released in the following months.

On March 30, 2021, the game was delisted from the Nintendo eShop.

Gameplay 

The gameplay is similar to other Art Academy games. Players are taught how to draw various characters from Disney and Pixar films in 40 step-by-step lessons. The game also uses the wireless communication function of the Nintendo 3DS by allowing players to send a demo of the game to each other.

Reception 
Reviews for the game were mixed. On Metacritic, the game has a weighted average score of 72/100 based on reviews from 16 critics, indicating "Mixed or average reviews". Critics were positive on the game's ability to teach how to draw familiar Disney characters, but criticized its slow pace and overall lack of offering beyond its premise.

References

External links
 

Art Academy
2016 video games
Disney video games
Drawing video games
Nintendo 3DS games
Nintendo 3DS eShop games
Nintendo 3DS-only games
Nintendo games
Nintendo Network games
Raster graphics editors
Video games developed in the United Kingdom
Headstrong Games
Children's educational video games
Single-player video games